The Borung Highway is a 138 kilometre rural highway in western Victoria running in a west–east direction from Dimboola in the west to Charlton in the east. The highway serves little more than connectivity between local communities, and is busiest between the towns of Donald and Charlton (with exception to the 15 km section that it shares with the Sunraysia Highway between Donald and Litchfield). The more notable features along the highway exist in the pastoral scenery, and the surprising appearance of lakes amongst the rolling hills. Buloke trees (from which the Shire of Buloke gets its name), are a regular feature along the eastern segment of the road.

It is notable that very few of the highways in Victoria have Aboriginal names. In the nineteenth century amateur scientist and long serving member of the Victorian Legislative Council W. E. Stanbridge made the most detailed record of Australian Aboriginal astronomy surviving. Stanbridge befriended the Booroung people near Lake Tyrrell, and presented the results to Victoria's Scientific Community The possibilities are that the Borung Highway was named for this tribe, or as is written in the history of the town of Borung the town "takes its name from an Aboriginal word meaning the broad leafed mallee scrub"

History
The passing of the Highways and Vehicles Act of 1924 through the Parliament of Victoria provided for the declaration of State Highways, roads two-thirds financed by the State government through the Country Roads Board (later VicRoads). The Borung Highway was declared a State Highway in the 1947/48 financial year, from Charlton via Donald to Warracknabeal (for a total of 61 miles); before this declaration, the road was referred to as Donald-Charlton Road. In the 1959/60 financial year, another section from Warracknebeal to Dimboola was added, along the former Dimboola-Warracknabeal Road.

The Borung Highway was signed as State Route 138 between Dimboola and Charlton in 1986; with Victoria's conversion to the newer alphanumeric system in the late 1990s, this was replaced by route C234 from Dimboola to Donald, C261 from Donald to Gill Gill, and C239 from Gil Gil to Charlton.

Borung-Charlton Road, running east from Charlton to Borung, is often locally referred to as the Borung Highway. Although it appears the Borung Highway was intended to at least end in Borung, the highway remains a shared single lane roadway without future plans for enhancement.

A curious fact is that the highway would then have the township of Borung at one end and the former Shire of Borung (renamed Shire of Warracknabeal in 1938) at the other. The Shire (which included Warracknabeal) was originally named the Shire of Borung in 1891 when it was split off from the Shire of St. Arnaud. The name was changed due to confusion in mail deliveries with the township of Borung, and during Victorian Council amalgamations in 1995 it was changed again to the Shire of Yarriambiack. The Shire of Borung did not include Dimboola but the larger County of Borung does.

Major intersections

References

See also

 Highways in Australia
 Highways in Victoria

Highways in Victoria (Australia)